Portea nana is a plant species in the genus Portea.

The bromeliad is endemic to the Atlantic Forest biome (Mata Atlantica Brasileira) and to Bahia state, located in southeastern Brazil.  It is a Critically endangered species in natural habitats.

References

nana
Endemic flora of Brazil
Flora of Bahia
Flora of the Atlantic Forest
Critically endangered flora of South America